Ronnie Faisst (born June 22, 1977) is an American professional freestyle motocross and snow bikecross rider. Faisst is a four-time Moto X bronze medalist and an original member of the Metal Mulisha. Faisst became a born-again Christian in 2006.

Early life 
Faisst grew up in the Mays Landing section of Hamilton Township, Atlantic County, New Jersey and graduated from Oakcrest High School in 1995. He took up motocross racing in the late 1980s. Faisst became one of the top riders in the Northeast winning at popular local tracks like Raceway Park and Sleepy Hollow. After turning pro in 1995 and racing local Nationals and Supercrosses, Faisst left for California in 1997.

X Games competition history

References 

Living people
1977 births
Freestyle motocross riders
Oakcrest High School alumni
Sportspeople from Atlantic County, New Jersey
People from Hamilton Township, Atlantic County, New Jersey
X Games athletes